Colesdale Park is a hamlet in the Canadian province of Saskatchewan.

Demographics 

References

Designated places in Saskatchewan
McKillop No. 220, Saskatchewan
Organized hamlets in Saskatchewan
Division No. 6, Saskatchewan